The 2015 Torbay Council election took place on 7 May 2015 to elect members of Torbay Council in England. This was on the same day as other local elections, and the general election.

Ward results

An asterisk * indicated an incumbent seeking re-election

Berry Head-with-Furzeham

Blatchcombe

Churston Ferrers with Galmpton

Clifton with Maidenway

Cockington-with-Chelston

Ellacombe

Goodrington with Roselands

Preston

Roundham with Hyde

Bobbie Davies was elected for this ward as a Liberal Democrat in 2011, and Rick Heyse stood in the seat as an English Radical in the same election.

Shiphay with The Willows

St Marychurch

St Mary's-with-Summercombe

Tormohun

Watcombe

Wellswood

By-elections 2015 to 2018

Clifton with Maidenway

The by-election was held on 5 November 2015, following the death of Councillor Ruth Pentney.

Tormohun

The by-election was called following the resignation of Councillor Andy Lang, and held on 5 May 2016.

Watcombe

The by-election was called following the death of Councillor Roger Stringer.  The by-election was held on 14 December 2017.

References

Torbay Council
Torbay Council election
2015
2010s in Devon